Ralph Senensky (born May 1, 1923) is an American television director and screenwriter. He studied at the Pasadena Playhouse and worked as a stage director before directing for television.

He directed multiple episodes for dozens of television shows from 1961 to 1988, including The Fugitive, the original series of Star Trek, The Partridge Family and The Waltons.

Filmography

Films

Television

References

Further reading
 "Ralph Senensky Directing Little Theater Production". Mason City Globe-Gazette. January 5, 1949. p. 12

External links

Interview with Ralph Senensky at StarTrekHistory.com
Ralph's Trek - personal blog
Ralph's Cinema Trek: A Journey in Film - senensky.com - personal website
 

1923 births
American bloggers
American television directors
American television writers
American male television writers
20th-century American Jews
Living people
People from Mason City, Iowa
Screenwriters from Iowa
American male bloggers
21st-century American screenwriters
21st-century American Jews